Heartbeat is the debut studio album by American actor and singer Don Johnson, released on September 30, 1986, by Epic Records. In the United States, the album peaked at number 17 on the Billboard 200 in October 1986 and was certified Gold by the Recording Industry Association of America (RIAA) the following month. The title track peaked at number five on the Billboard Hot 100.

In 1998, the album was reissued by Razor & Tie with six additional tracks from Johnson's follow-up album, Let It Roll (1989).

Background
In a 1987 interview with the Los Angeles Times, Johnson stated, "I wanted the record to be modern, tough rock and I think I achieved that on some level. I didn't want it to sound like something that other people designed and I just stopped by for a few minutes to do the vocals. And I made it clear to Walter [Yetnikoff, then president and CEO of CBS Records] that I would walk away from it if I didn't think it was credible. I was prepared every step of the way to throw it away and walk away."

Musician reviewer J. D. Considine wrote: "Don Johnson sings as well as Glenn Frey acts."

Track listing
All tracks produced by Chas Sandford, except tracks 11–16, produced by Keith Diamond.

Personnel
Credits adapted from the liner notes of Heartbeat.

Musicians

 Don Johnson – lead vocals 
 Chas Sandford – guitar ; guitar solo ; background vocals ; piano, tambourine 
 Mark Leonard – bass 
 Curly Smith – drums 
 Charles Judge – keyboards 
 Bill Champlin – background vocals ; keyboards ; organ 
 Tamara Champlin – background vocals 
 Dweezil Zappa – guitar solo 
 Bonnie Raitt – harmony vocals 
 Earl Gardner – horns 
 Lenny Pickett – horns ; sax solo ; horn arrangements
 Michael Des Barres – background vocals 
 Ron Wood – acoustic guitar ; guitars, harmony vocals 
 Stevie Ray Vaughan – guitar solo 
 Dickey Betts – guitars 
 Jamie Skylar – background vocals 
 Willie Nelson – solo, harmony vocals 
 Mickey Raphael – harmonica

Technical
 Chas Sandford – production, mixing
 Gary McGachan – engineering, mixing
 Dave Axelbaum – second engineer
 Stephen Marcussen – mastering
 Stuart Furusho – mastering

Artwork
 Frank Olinsky (Manhattan Design) – art direction
 Roberta Ludlow – cover illustration
 Mary Ellen Mark – back cover photo, inside photo (left)
 Stephen Frailey – inside photo (right)
 Jerry Tobias – collage photos, inner sleeve photo
 Glenn Watson – collage photos
 Diane Sillan – collage photos
 Mark Penberthy – inner sleeve illustration

Charts

Weekly charts

Year-end charts

Certifications

Notes

References

1986 debut albums
Don Johnson albums
Epic Records albums